The National Convention for the Progress of Burkina (CNPB) was a political party in Burkina Faso led by Jourouboundou René Lompo.

History
The party received 0.5% of the vote in the 2012 parliamentary elections, winning a single seat in the National Assembly.

References

Defunct political parties in Burkina Faso